Ahotguri mouza is one of the three mouzas of Majuli, other two being Salmora and Kamalabari. It is located at the lower most part of Majuli and comprises over 200 villages. But due to severe flood erosion of Brahmaputra river it has been vanished recently leaving thousands of families homeless.

See also
Namoni Majuli
List of villages in Majuli

References

Geography of Assam
Majuli district